Mushroom Peak is a mountain located in the Sunwapta River valley of Alberta, Canada's Jasper National Park, lying just over a kilometre east of Diadem Peak. The mountain was named in 1947 by Noel E. Odell who made the first ascent (solo). Upon reaching the summit, he found that the dark limestone rocks there resembled mushrooms. The mountain can be seen from the Icefields Parkway.

Climate
Based on the Köppen climate classification, Mushroom Peak is located in a subarctic climate with cold, snowy winters, and mild summers.

Geology
Mushroom Peak is composed of sedimentary rock laid down during the Precambrian to Jurassic periods. Formed in shallow seas, this sedimentary rock was pushed east and over the top of younger rock during the Laramide orogeny.

See also
List of mountains in the Canadian Rockies
Geography of Alberta

Gallery

References

External links
 National Park Service web site: Jasper National Park
 Mushroom Peak weather web site: Mountain Forecast

Three-thousanders of Alberta
Winston Churchill Range
Mountains of Jasper National Park